Asif Fawad (born 22 December 1990) is a Pakistani cricketer. He made his first-class debut for Multan in the 2013–14 Quaid-e-Azam Trophy on 23 October 2013.

References

External links
 

1990 births
Living people
Pakistani cricketers
Multan cricketers
Peshawar cricketers
Cricketers from Punjab, Pakistan
Place of birth missing (living people)